The 2000 TV Guide NZ Television Awards were staged on Saturday 11 November 2000 at the Aotea Centre in Auckland, New Zealand. Honouring excellence in New Zealand television for the previous year, the awards were sponsored by New Zealand TV Guide magazine.

Nominees and winners

Awards were given in 28 categories. Due to a lack of eligible entries, there were no nominees or winner in the Best One-off Drama category.

Best children's programme
What Now?
Suzy's World
Pukana

Best documentary
The Fatal Game
Return to Romania
He Rau Aroha

Best drama series or serial
Duggan
Shortland Street

Best entertainment programme
The $20 Challenge "London"Style Magazine Fashion CollectionBest entertainment seriesPolyfest 2000
Havoc & Newsboy's Sell-out Tour
Ice As

Best factual series
Our People Our Century
Legends of the All Blacks
Coming Home

Best lifestyle series
Backch@t
Maggie's Garden Show
Corbans Taste New Zealand

Best comedy programme
Pulp Comedy
Havoc 2000 Deluxe

Best news and current affairs programme
60 Minutes
20/20
3 News

Best sports programme
America's Cup, The Final Day
On Tour with the All Black Army
ALAC Sports Awards of New Zealand

Best Maori language programme
Moko Toa
Waka Huia

Best Maori programme
Nga Morehu End of an Era
It's Cool to Korero
Nga Tohu: Signatures

Best actress
Nancy Brunning, Nga Tohu: Signatures
Geraldine Brophy, Shortland Street
Nicola Kawana, Jacksons Wharf

Best actor
George Henare, Nga Tohu: Signatures
John Bach, Duggan "Shadow of Doubt"
Patrick Toomey, Jacksons Wharf

Best supporting actress
Stephanie Tauevihi, Shortland Street
Michele Amas, Duggan "Food to Die For"
Nicole Whippy, Jacksons Wharf

Best supporting actor
Ross Duncan, Nga Tohu: Signatures
Blair Strang, Shortland Street

Best performance in an entertainment or comedy programme
Jon Bridges, Ice As
Mikey Havoc and Newsboy, Havoc and Newsboy's Sell-out Tour
Madeleine Sami, Ice As

Best presenter
John Campbell
Jim Hickey
Judy Bailey

Best drama script
Donna Malane, Duggan "Workshop for Murder"
Judy Callingham, Duggan "Shadow of Doubt"

Best factual programme or documentary script
Philip Temple, Our People Our Century "Families at War"
Bryan Bruce, Ian Johnstone, The Trouble with Ben
Keith Quinn, Colin McRae, John Keir, Legends of the All Blacks

Best director, drama
Andrew Bancroft, Nga Tohu: Signatures
Justine Simei-Barton, Matou Uma
Yvonne Mackay, Duggan "Shadow of Doubt"

Best director, factual programme or documentary
Cheryl Cameron, Destination Disaster: Sinking of the Mikhail Lermontov
Megan Jones, Return to Romania
John Milligan, Shipwreck

Best camera
Peter Young, Country Calendar "Yankee Harvest"
Leon Narbey, Duggan "Shadow of Doubt"
Camera Team, America's Cup

Best editing
Paul Sutorius, Getting to our Place
Bryan Shaw, Return to Romania
Paul Sutorius, Duggan "Shadow of Doubt"

Best original music
Clive Cockburn, Destination Disaster
Gareth Farr, Duggan "Shadow of Doubt"
Felicity Williams, Dress Up Box

Best contribution to a soundtrack
Haresh Bhana, America's Cup
Ian Leslie, Our People Our Century

Best design
Guy Moana, Moko Toa
Catriona Campbell, Baby Proms
Ned Wenlock, Wired

Best contribution to design
Paul Sharp, Virtual Spectator Animation America's Cup
Brad Mill, Art Direction, The Tribe

References

External links
2000 TV Guide NZ Television Awards

New Zealand television awards
Television awards
New Zealand
Awards
2000s in New Zealand cinema
November 2000 events in New Zealand